The 1974 Wisconsin gubernatorial election was held on November 5, 1974.  Democrat Patrick Lucey won the election with 53% of the vote, winning his second term as Governor of Wisconsin and defeating Republican William Dyke.

As of 2022, this is the last time a Democratic gubernatorial candidate won Waukesha, Ozaukee and Washington Counties. These three counties, collectively known as WOW, have traditionally been among the most Republican areas in the state. This is also the most recent Wisconsin gubernatorial election in which both major party candidates are now deceased.

Results

References

1974 Wisconsin elections
1974
Wisconsin